The Malawian records in swimming are the fastest ever performances of swimmers from Malawi, which are recognised and ratified by the Malawi Aquatic Union.

All records were set in finals unless noted otherwise.

Long Course (50 m)

Men

Women

Mixed relay

Short Course (25 m)

Men

Women

References

Malawi
Records
Swimming